Rafael Cruz (born May 19, 1977) is a Dominican Republic former professional baseball player. He played in 2007 for the Chunichi Dragons of Nippon Professional Baseball (NPB).

In 2009, while playing in Minor League Baseball, he was suspended for 50 games for using stanozolol, a performance-enhancing drug.

References

External links
, or NPB

1977 births
Living people
Baseball players suspended for drug offenses
Chunichi Dragons players
Dominican Republic sportspeople in doping cases
Dominican Republic expatriate baseball players in Japan
Dominican Republic expatriate baseball players in the United States
Estrellas Orientales players
Gulf Coast Rangers players
Gwinnett Braves players
Mississippi Braves players
Nippon Professional Baseball pitchers
People from Santiago de los Caballeros
Pulaski Rangers players
Savannah Sand Gnats players
Tigres del Licey players